Hannover Bismarckstraße is a railway station located in Hannover, Germany. The station opened on 1 May 1911 and is located on the Hanoverian Southern Railway, Hanover–Würzburg high-speed railway and Hanover–Altenbeken railway. The train services are operated by Deutsche Bahn as part of the Hanover S-Bahn.

Train services
The following services currently call at the station:

Hannover S-Bahn services  Minden - Haste - Wunstorf - Hanover - Weetzen - Haste
Hannover S-Bahn services  Nienburg - Wunstorf - Hanover - Weetzen - Haste
Hannover S-Bahn services  Bennemühlen - Langenhagen - Hannover - Hannover Messe/Laatzen - Hildesheim
Hannover S-Bahn services  Hannover Airport - Langenhagen - Hannover - Weetzen - Hameln - Paderborn
Hannover S-Bahn services  Hannover Airport - Langenhagen - Hannover - Hannover Messe/Laatzen

References

Bismarckstrasse
Hannover S-Bahn stations
Railway stations in Germany opened in 1911